As of the end of 2022, there have been 25 NRL Premierships and 116 overall, including the competition's predecessors (NSWRL, ARL and *Super League). This is a list of all the grand finals that were played to decide those premierships.

The premierships not decided by a grand final were determined by league ladder position. These years were 1909, 1912, 1913, 1914, 1915, 1917, 1918, 1919, 1920, 1921, 1925 and 1937.

Since 1954 the grand final was officially sanctioned as the only way to determine the premiership, but it had been commonplace for decades before that.

List

Team Performance

See also

List of NRL Women's Grand finals
Australian rugby league premiers

References

NRL Grand Finals
Grand finals